The 2020 Austin Peay Governors football team represented Austin Peay State University during the 2020–21 NCAA Division I FCS football season. The Governors were led by Scotty Walden and played their home games at Fortera Stadium. They were competing as a member of the Ohio Valley Conference.

Previous season

The Governors finished the 2019 season ranked No. 8 in the FCS standings and went 11–4, 7–1 in OVC play to finish in a tie for first place.

Though they were co-champions with Southeast Missouri State, the Governors received the Ohio Valley Conference’s automatic bid to the FCS playoffs. They advanced to the Quarterfinals after beating Furman and Sacramento State before they lost 24–10 to Montana State.

Schedule
Due to COVID-19, the OVC made the decision to postpone conference games to Spring 2021, allowing all member schools to play 3 non-conference games in the fall. However, OVC games were moved to Spring 2021.

Game summaries

vs. Central Arkansas

at Pittsburgh

at Cincinnati

References

Austin Peay
Austin Peay Governors football seasons
Austin Peay Governors football